State Road 57 (NM 57) is a state highway in the US state of New Mexico. NM 57's southern terminus is at the San Juan–McKinley county line where it continues south as Navajo Route 14, and NM 57's northern terminus is at U.S. Route 550 (US 550) northwest of Nageezi.

History
NM 57 was originally NM 56, but was renumbered to NM 57 to avoid confusion with US 56. From 1970 to 1988 the southern terminus was at NM 53 west of Ice Cave. After the 1988 statewide renumbering NM 57 extended from Interstate 40 (I-40) to NM 44, which is now US 550. The segment from Milan to NM 53 around the Ice Cave was removed from the state highway system in 1988. Then in 1989, the portion of NM 57 between Chaco Canyon and Crownpoint were removed from the state highway system and are now Indian Routes. The portion south of Crownpoint is now part of NM 371. The portion in McKinley County from NM 371 eastward to Navajo Route 14 became Navajo Route 9 in a road exchange agreement on July 1, 1989.

Major intersections

See also

References

057
Transportation in San Juan County, New Mexico